A Thief Catcher is a one-reel 1914 American comedy film, produced by Mack Sennett for his Keystone film company, directed by Ford Sterling, and starring Sterling, Mack Swain, Edgar Kennedy, and Charles Chaplin as a policeman.

Cast

 Ford Sterling: Chief
 Charles Chaplin: Policeman (uncredited)
 William Hauber: Policeman (uncredited)
 George Jeske: Policeman (uncredited)
 Edgar Kennedy: Crook (uncredited)
 Rube Miller:Policeman (uncredited)
 Mack Swain: Crook (uncredited)

Synopsis
Three armed burglars stop atop an embankment to divide the loot from a recent crime.  When one of the men complains about how the shares are split, a fight erupts.  The complainer is eventually pushed over the embankment by the other two thieves.  By chance, a police chief (Ford Sterling) who was out with his dog and his camera, takes a photo of the burglars.  They spot him and pursue him.  Eventually the police chief flees unknowingly to a barn which the burglars have been using as their hideout.  The police chief appears to be cornered in the barn but he dispatches a note with his dog who takes it to police headquarters.  The bumbling police force arrives and eventually captures the burglars, but not without considerable difficulty.

Charlie Chaplin briefly appears as one of the policemen about two-thirds of the way through the film.

Preservation status
The film was believed lost and Chaplin's appearance unknown until a vintage 16mm print was discovered by director / film historian Paul E. Gierucki in 2010 at a Michigan antique sale. Chaplin had, however, claimed in interviews that he had played a bit-role as a policeman while at Keystone Studios.

See also
 List of American films of 1914
 Charlie Chaplin filmography
 List of rediscovered films

References

External links

1910s rediscovered films
1914 comedy films
1914 films
1914 short films
American black-and-white films
American silent short films
American comedy short films
Films directed by Ford Sterling
Films produced by Mack Sennett
Keystone Studios films
1910s police comedy films
Rediscovered American films
1910s American films
Silent American comedy films